O'Dowd is an Irish Gaelic clan based most prominently in what is today County Mayo and County Sligo. The clan name originated in the 9th century as a derivative of its founder Dubda mac Connmhach. They descend in the paternal line from the Connachta's Uí Fiachrach. The immediate progenitors of the O'Dowd were Kings of Connacht during the 7th and 8th centuries in the form of Dúnchad Muirisci, Indrechtach mac Dúnchado, Ailill Medraige mac Indrechtaig and Donn Cothaid mac Cathail, before losing ground to their rivals the Uí Briúin.

Genealogically, they are closely related to the O'Shaughnessy, MacFirbis, O’Finnerty (Ó Fiannachta) all members of Clan Conway (i.e. Connmhach). Indeed, the O'Dowd were the main patrons of the MacFirbis clan who produced key works of Irish history such as the Great Book of Lecan and the Leabhar na nGenealach. From the 8th to the 15th centuries, the O'Dowd were Kings of Ui Fiachrach Muaidhe, a sub-kingdom within the Kingdom of Connacht. After their realm was incorporated into the Kingdom of Ireland, they were Lord of Tír Fhiacrach

Naming conventions

O'Dowd is the most common anglicisation of the Irish surname Ó Dubhda. Other anglicised variants are Dowd, Dawdy, Dowdy, O'Dowda and Dowds, with Doody and Duddy, found around Killarney, where a branch of the Connacht family settled. All are Ó Dubhda (pronounced O Dooda) in Irish, the root word being "dubh" black. A quite distinct minor sept of Ó Dubhda was located in County Londonderry. Descendants of this sept in Ulster today are usually anglicised as Duddy, Dowd or Dowds.

Annalistic references

 AI1126.12 Ua Dubda, king of Uí Amalgada, was drowned along with the crews of two coracles.
 AI1127.11 Gilla Críst Ua Dubda of Cenél Eógain Aelaig died.

History 
The O'Dowd clan or sept traces its descent from Fiachrae, an older half-brother of Niall of the Nine Hostages, through Nath Í mac Fiachrach (aka Dathí), the last pagan High King of Ireland.  Irish legend and early texts claim Dathí was killed by a bolt of lightning as he led an army to the foot of the Alps in 455 AD. His grandson Aillil succeeded as King of Connacht and later King of Tara until 482.

For centuries they were the leading sept of the northern Uí Fiachrach, a tribal group that occupied the modern counties of Mayo and Sligo. The Uí Fiachrach provided successive kings of Connacht for a long period, but their sphere of influence became confined to North Connacht. In the late 10th century, their king was named Aedh Ua Dubhda (Hugh O'Dooda). He is recorded as having 'died an untroubled death' in the year 982, making this surname one of the oldest in Europe. His grandson, Mulrony, who died in 1005 had the title of Lord of Hyfiachrach. The O'Dowds were a maritime power of considerable ability in the twelfth and thirteenth centuries. On land they managed to hold their territory intact against the superior forces of the Burkes and Birminghams. Their territory at its widest embraced the túatha of Erris and Tír Amhlaidh in Mayo and Tir Fhiacrach Múaidhe in Sligo. They forged a kingdom in Uí Fiachrach Muaidhe (Northwest Connacht) which they ringed with 20 castles, often referred to as "10-Pound Castles," and held off all comers for centuries until the incursion of the Anglo-Normans.

The style and design of these small Irish castles is said to have originated from a subsidy of 10-Pounds which was granted by Henry IV in 1429. However, many of the O'Dowd castles have a far more ancient history of being built directly over the site of Stone Age and Bronze Age fortifications.

They were traditionally inaugurated as princes of Ui Fiachrach at Carn Amhalghaigh near Killala, on the east shore of Killala Bay near the border of Sligo and Mayo. They were considerably reduced by the Anglo-Norman incursion into Connacht in the thirteenth century but were still powerful and in 1354 Sen-Bhrian O'Dowd succeeded in driving all the Anglo-Norman settlers out of Tireragh for a time.

The O'Dowds are unique in having left a detailed account of the inauguration ceremony of their Taoiseach (clan leader). This was written in an ancient manuscript known as the Great Book of Lecan, written near Enniscrone in Tireragh between 1397 and 1418 and now carefully preserved in Dublin. The inaugural ceremony of each succeeding O'Dowd was presided over by a MacFirbis, the hereditary chroniclers of the clan. One of the most generous sponsors of the MacFirbis scholars was Tadhg Riabhach Ó Dubhda ('Dark Teige'), who became Taoiseach of Tireragh in 1417. He is particularly remembered in this manuscript where his death is recorded at Enniscrone Castle.

The last election of an O'Dowd Taoiseach took place in 1595. By this time they were simply a client clan of the O'Connor clan of Sligo. This coincided with the Nine Years War, when the last independent Irish clans rose to resist English occupation of Ulster. The clan played an honourable role in the war, assisting Hugh Roe O'Donnell, in defending the western border of Ulster from incursions by the Earl of Essex in 1599 (most probably at the Battle of Curlew Pass). With the Irish defeat in 1603, their power rapidly dwindled and they were deprived of most of their patrimonial possessions. Daithi Óg O'Dowd, who married in 1636, was the last generation of O'Dowds given by MacFirbis in his pedigree of the clan. This also coincides with historical events – namely the Cromwellian reconquest (1642) following Ulster's 1641 revolt.

From the rarity of the surname today, one must conclude that these successive wars, particularly those in the 17th century against the English, and the subsequent savage repression, greatly diminished O'Dowd numbers along with their power and influence.

Several O'Dowds were bishops of the see of Killala. Father John Ó Duada, who was tortured and hanged in 1579, was one of the many Irish Franciscan martyrs. Many of the name appear in the ranks of the Confederate Catholics and, later in the seventeenth century, in Catholic King James II of England's army during the Williamite war in Ireland (1688–1691). The head of the sept at that time, who was killed at the Battle of the Boyne (1690), is said to have been seven feet tall.

The O'Dowd castle was built in Carn Amhalghaigh in 1477. The O'Dowds occupied the castle until the Cromwellian re-conquest. The castle was used as a Williamite military base during the later war and ceased to be inhabited shortly thereafter. A smaller keep was built at Castleconner near Ballina in 1520 by Conor O'Dowd, the Taoiseach of the time. Both castles are now in ruins.

The noted Irish genealogiest, Dubhaltach Mac Fhirbhisigh, was the last of the 'senchai' or hereditary historicans to the family. He was murdered in 1671.

Chief of the Name
 Brian Ó Dubhda; U1446.4: Brian Ua Dubda was slain by the Tir-Amhalghaidh.
 Maol Ruanaidh mac Ruaidhrí Ó Dubhda, d. 1450 (18)
 Domhnall Baile Ui Choitil Ó Dubhda, 1447–1454 (7)
 Tadhg Buidhe mac Tadhg Riabhach Ó Dubhda, c. 1454-c.1457 (3)
 Seaán Glas mac Tadhg Riabhach Ó Dubhda, c.1457–71?(14)
 Éamonn mac An Cosnamhach Ó Dubhda (5 and a half weeks) c. 1466?
 Domhnall Ballach Ó Dubhda, (1), c. 1472?
 Brian Cam mac An Cosnmhach Ó Dubhda, (2) c.1472-c.1474?
 Eóghan Caoch mac Ruaidhrí Ó Dubhda (14), c. 1474-c.1488?
 Uilliam mac Domhnall Ballach Ó Dubhda, (half a year) c. 1488?
 Brian Óg Ó Dubhda, (half a year) c. 1488?
 Donnchadh Ultach Ó Dubhda (1), c. 1489?
 Maghnus mac Tadhg Buidhe Ó Dubhda, (1), c. 1490?
 Owen Caech Ó Dubhda, died 1495.
 Uilliam Dubh Ó Dubhda, died 1496 (LCe;1496. Ó Dubhda, Dubh, i.e. William, the son of Domhnall Ballach, died.)
 Féilim mac Tadhg Buidhe Ó Dubhda, (19), c. 1490?-c. 1509?
 Conchabhar mac Diarmaid mac Maol Ruanaidh Ó Dubhda (30), c. 1509?-c.1549?
 Éoghan mac Conchabhar Ó Dubhda, (7), c. 1549?–1556?
 Cathal Dubh mac Conchabhar Ó Dubhda, c.1556?-?
 Cathal Dubh mac Conchabhar Ó Dubhda, d. 1582.
 Dathí Ruadh Ó Dubhda, d. 1594.
 Dathí mac Dathí Ruadh Ó Dubhda, 1591-c.1660
 Dathí Óge Ó Dubhda, fl. 1656–1705.
 Dominick O'Dowda, d. 1737.
 Thady fitz Dominick O'Dowda, d. 1767.
 James Vippler O'Dowda, Baron O'Dowda, ex. 1798.
 Thady O'Dowd, fl. 1854.
 James Vippler O'Dowd, d. 1865.
 John Taaffe O'Dowd, d. 1895.
 John Charles Haughton O'Dowd, d. 1916.
 Albert Frederick O'Dowd, d. 1941.
 Robert Francis O'Dowd, d. 1998.
 Robert Frederick O'Dowd, d. 2017.

See also Kings of Ui Fiachrach Muaidhe

O'Dowd Castles

The kingdom of the O'Dowds was ringed by 20 castles, most of which are now in ruins. The location of these castles are as follows: No:1 Lough Conn; No:2 Mount Balcon, River Moy; No:3 Beaufield; No:4 Belleek Castle, Ballina; No:5 Castleconor, River Moy; No:6 Castleton Manor; No:7 Enniscrone; No:8 Carahduff; No:9 Rathlee; No:10 Rosslee, Easkey; No:11 Dromore; No:12 Doonecoy; No:13 Cartron; No:14 Dromard; No:15 Lomford; No:16 Flooneen; No:17 Ballymote; No:18 Markcree; No:19 Lough Gill; No:20 Drumcliff Bay.

These castles and ruins were researched and located over many years by the Clan O'Dowd historian, Conor Mac Hale.
The O'Dowdas (O'Dowds) were chieftains of west Sligo in Anglo-Norman times and they built the Castle in Ballina, Co Mayo in 1447. The O'Dowds occupied the castle until the Cromwellian era (17th century). The castle is of three stories. Two of the main features are the subsidiary turrets that are situated on diagonally opposed corners. The outside measurements are approx. 20m in length and 10m wide. The thickness of the walls varies between 1.65m and 2.13m.

The castle has been renovated over the years and two chimneys were added in the seventeenth century. Many of the original archer slits remain intact. After the eviction of the O'Dowds during the Cromwellian Plantation of the 1650s the castle and lands were given to Robert Morgan.
It was used as a military site for the Williamite army during the war between the Catholic King James and the Protestant William of Orange. At the close of the 17th century the castle ceased to be inhabited.

Nottingham O'Dowds

Formed Pre WWI the Nottingham O'Dowds are a large Family. Edward O'Dowd's grandfather moved from Ireland at an unknown date. Edward then went on to marry Lucy and between them had 9 children. Two girls and seven boys, the eldest also named Edward. The eldest daughter is Joyce followed by Patrick O'Dowd. The names of the rest of the Nottingham O'Dowd children are Terry, Peter, Barry, Diane, Anthony and Trevor. There are estimated to be around 20 families of O'Dowd in and around Nottingham to this day.

Argentine O'Dowds

There are at least three families named Dowd (or O'Dowd), whose descendants are currently living in Argentina. One family descends from James Dowd who was born in Dublin in 1828, and who is recorded as marrying Mary Ann Heery. Another family descends from Michael Dowd who was born in Westmeath in 1824, and he is recorded as marrying Eileen Burke. The third family descends from another Michael Dowd who is said to have been born in Ireland in 1804.
There is yet another Dowd branch in Argentina, that of Edward O'Dowd, married to Kathleen Lynch in Ireland (date unknown) parents of Edward Michael O'Dowd (born 1856 or 1857 in Westmeath). Edward emigrated to Argentina and settled in Navarro, Provincia de Buenos Aires, working in a farm.  He married Mary Kelly Moran (whose parents were William Kelly and Anne Moran, both born in Ireland, emigrated to Argentina) and had 4 children: Anne "Annie" Dowd, Kathleen "Kitty" Dowd, Edward Dowd and John Dowd.  Annie, Kitty and John died childless.  Edward married Winifred Lucy Reynolds (born in New Zealand April 16, 1898), and died only 53 days later.  Fortunately, Winifred was pregnant and gave birth to Eduardo José Dowd on March 31, 1931, who, in turn married Mercedes García (born in Asturias, Spain on December 19, 1931). They had 5 children, who live in Argentina.

New Zealand O'Dowds

The New Zealand branch of the O'Dowds (and Dowds), are descended from Patrick O'Dowd and Anna (née: Kenny). Patrick O'Dowd was born in Easky, Sligo in Ireland in 1805. He enlisted into the 97th Regiment of Foot (The Earl of Ulster's – also known as the "Celestials" due to the colour of their flashes on their uniforms) in 1824, aged 16.
He was a Private and served 16 years in the British Army, including 11 years with the Regiment in Ceylon. Upon his retirement from the British Army he was living in Manchester with his wife Anna and 4 children.
He enlisted into The Royal New Zealand Fencibles (from the word defencible) and sailed for New Zealand from Gravesend on 1 July 1847, with his family aboard the "SS Minerva," arriving in the Port of Auckland 8 October 1847. This was the 2nd Detachment of Fencibles and included 80 Fencibles, 67 wives and 145 children.

There are about 180 families living in New Zealand, mainly in the Auckland region who bear the surname O'Dowd or Dowd. Craig Dowd the well known All Black is one of these descendants.

Modern Clan O'Dowd Chieftains

Thomas J Dowds Clan O'Dowd Chieftain 1997–2003
Tom Dowds was elected as the Clan Chieftain at the Clan Rally in 1997, and served the Clan in that appointment until 2003. Descended from the O'Dowds of Kilglass, Thomas's grandfather, Patrick left Easkey for Scotland and his father, also Thomas, was born in Glasgow, but the family returned to Ireland and he was brought up in Easkey. The family again moved to Scotland in the 1920s and settled in Govan. Thomas (the Clan Chieftain), was born in England in 1937, but educated in Scotland at St Anthony's Primary and St Gerard's Secondary schools in Govan, before choosing a career in education.

In 1968, Thomas graduated BA (Hons) in Economic History from the University of Strathclyde and gained the Teachers Secondary Certificate from Jordanhill College and the Diploma in Education from the University of Glasgow in 1969.

Thomas married to Cathie (née Harvey) and had two sons and a daughter and three grandchildren. His interest in Irish, and particularly Ó Dubhda history resulted in his being one of the first members of the Ó Dubhda Clan Association in 1990, and he has attended every rally since. In 1997, he was chosen as the Taoiseach-elect when the Chieftainship was restored, and in September 2000 was inaugurated with Brehon rites at Cahir Mor as The Ó Dubhda – the first chief in over 400 years.  At the same meeting, Richard F Dowd of New Jersey was chosen as the Tánaiste. During his period in office he has represented the clan at the 1798 Bicentennial celebrations and at the unveiling of the memorial to Baron James O'Dowda, while at the same time making efforts to contact Ó Dubhda clansmen worldwide. In September 2003, he handed the white staff of office, the Ó Dubhda standard and the Chief's personal pennant to his successor, Richard F. Dowd.

Richard F Dowd Clan O'Dowd Chieftain 2003–2006

Richard Dowd is descended from Thomas Dowd, one of a family of brothers who left Ireland to escape the aftermath of the Great Famine. It is believed that the Dowds were originally from Mayo. The family settled in the United States and Richard was born in Brooklyn, New York City of 24 November 1928.

He was educated at St Johns University, New York City and graduated with the degree of BA in 1957. During his career, he undertook further studies at the New York University Graduate School of Business Administration, gaining the degree of MBA in 1964, and PhD in 1976, for a Doctoral Dissertation entitled, "Efficiency in Government Spending."

After serving as an Engineer with the US Merchant Marine (1946–48), Richard moved to United Airlines, where he was a Radio Electric Mechanic from 1951 to 1957. After graduating from university he became a Security Analyst with Merrill Lynch (1957–60) before setting up his own business, R F Dowd & Company Inc, becoming President of the Investment Banking firm. In 1963 he moved to Value Line Investments as a Security Analyst and remained with them until 1965. In 1963, he was appointed Professor of Economics at the City University of New York, which post he held until his retirement in 1992.

Richard spent many holidays in Ireland and was keen to trace his family's roots, which he discovered lay in the West of Ireland. The founding of the Ó Dubhda Clan Association in 1990 was of great interest to him and he was a member right from the start and has not missed one Rally since. At the 1997 Rally, he was elected Tánaiste (Heir) to the Chieftain and was formally installed in that post at Cahir Mor in September 2000. In September 2003, he received the white staff as he was inaugurated as the Taoiseach of the Ó Dubhda Clan, and Edward O'Dowd of Chicago was elected Tánaiste.

Edward P. O'Dowd Clan Ó Dubhda Chieftain 2006–2009 - Chicago, Il. US

Michael F Dowd Clan Ó Dubhda Chieftain 2009–2012  Brisbane Qld, Australia

In late 1601 Tadgh Bui, Taoiseach (Chieftain) of the Ó Dubhda Clan, rode with his 50 horsemen to Kinsale accompanied by his brother-in-law Red Hugh O'Donnell and his troops to fight the English and expel them from Ireland forever. His cousin O’Neill proceeded to Kinsale with his army separately. The battle lost, Dubhda fled to Kerry where he settled securely with Mt. Brandon at his back, Brandon Bay to the North and East, and impenetrable bogs to the South. His descendants are still there today. Mike Dowd, Irish national, Australian citizen and resident, and descendant of Tadgh Bui was Inaugurated as Taoiseach in 2009. The area where Tadgh Bui settled in Kerry was well known to the Clan for thousands of years and is where King Daithi's Memorial Stone was sourced.

Brendan O'Dowd Clan Ó Dubhda Chieftain 2012–2015  Castlebar, County Mayo, Ireland

Brendan Joseph O'Dowd was born in 1965 and lived at  "Greenwood" Culleens, Kilglass. Co. Sligo.  Previous to 1798 the family lived in Rathlee, Co. Sligo. (Following the rising in 1798 all Catholic families within one mile of the sea were moved further away in order to prevent another French invasion.)

The O'Dowd family moved to Naas, Co Kildare in 1974 where Brendan went to the Christian Brothers School. Later he studied at The University of Liverpool obtaining a BSc. Hons. in diagnostic radiography. He currently works as a radiographer at Mayo University Hospital, Castlebar Co Mayo about forty minutes from his native Kilglass.  Brendan has lived and worked in many different countries including London UK, Boston, MA USA, Vancouver BC. Canada.

Brendan was elected Taniste of the Ó Dubhda Clan at the 2009 Gathering in Enniscrone, Co. Sligo. He was Inaugurated as Taoiseach of the Ó Dubhda Clan at the 2012 Gathering.  While in office as Tánaiste and Taoiseach he organized both the 2012 and 2015 Clan Gatherings and rejoined the Clans of Ireland, representing the Ó Dubhda Clan at Áras an Uachtaráin meeting with President Michael D. Higgins in June 2015.

Brendan O'Dowd was succeeded in October 2015 by Andrew Dowds from Glasgow as the current Taoiseach.

Andrew Dowds Clan Ó Dubhda Chieftain 2015–2018  Glasgow, Scotland, UK

Born in Glasgow, Scotland in 1966, Thomas Andrew Dowds is the son of Thomas Dowds, The first Taoiseach of the modern era. His grandfather grew up in Easky and from him he learned stories of the Ó Dubhda Clan. As the son of a history teacher, he was able to research the history of the Ó Dubhda Clan from a very early age. His journeys to Ireland in the 1970s and 80's were punctuated by journeys to graveyards and ruined castles.  His passion for history and early Irish history in particular, is second only to his passion for classic cars and motorbikes. As a confirmed 'petrolhead', he has built and restored a number of classic vehicles.  He currently lives in Scotland with his wife and son.

Kieran O’Dowd Clan Ó Dubhda Chieftain 2018–Present  San Francisco, CA. USA

Kieran was elected as the first woman Tanaiste' at the 2015 Gathering in Enniscrone, Co. Sligo. and was inaugurated as the clan Taoiseach on 6 October 2018. She holds the distinction of being the first female chieftain of the Ó Dubhda Clan. As the Tanaiste', she was the planner for the 2018 clan Gathering – promoting the Gathering and was instrumental in bringing the clan into the 21st century with online registration. The daughter of Paul and Judy O'Dowd of San Francisco (great granddaughter of Thomas Paul O'Dowd former Supervisor of the City of San Francisco), Kieran grew up living around the world with her parents and three brothers as her father was a career Army officer.  After graduating from university, Kieran worked as a civil servant for many years and currently works for a major US airline.  Her passion is spreading the word about the Ó Dubhda Clan – inspiring clan members to participate in the history of the Ó Dubhda Clan no matter where they reside and the history and culture of the Emerald Isle. Kieran currently makes Fort Wayne, Indiana (USA) her home.

Arms
O'Hart records two arms for members of the family. One in what is today County Mayo (the senior branch) and the other in Sligo.

Princes of Hy-Fiachra (Mayo)
 ARMS – Vert a saltire or, in chief two swords in saltire, points upwards, the dexter surmounted of the sinister argent, pommels and hilts gold.
 CREST – over a coronet, a dexter hand in armour, holding a dart, proper.
 SUPPORTERS – two lions rampant
 MOTTO – "Virtus Ipsa Suis Firmissima Nititur Armis" (Bravery is Best Sustained by Arms). Irish: Bíonn crógacht is seasmhaí faoi chothú arm

Princes of Hy-Fiachra (Sligo)
 ARMS – or a saltier sable, in chief two swords in saltier, points upwards, the dexter surmounted of the sinister argent, pommels and hilts gold, in base and oak leaf, the stalk upwards, vert.
 CREST – over a coronet, a dexter hand in armour, holding a dart, proper.
 SUPPORTERS – two lions rampant
 MOTTO – "Virtus Ipsa Suis Firmissima Nititur Armis" (Bravery is Best Sustained by Arms). Irish: Bíonn crógacht is seasmhaí faoi chothú arm

People

For people named Dowd please see Dowd
 Alex O'Dowd (1967), professional first-class rugby coach and former New Zealand first-class cricketer
 Anna Mae O'Dowd, former professional baseball player
 Bernard O'Dowd (1866–1953) Australian activist, educator, poet, journalist and author
 Boy George (born George Alan O'Dowd, 1961), British singer-songwriter
 Cathy O'Dowd, South African rock climber, mountaineer, author and motivational speaker
 Chris O'Dowd (1979), Irish actor and comedian
 Christopher O'Dowd (1920–1943), founding member of the British SAS.
 Colin O'Dowd (1966), Irish physicist and atmospheric scientist
 Dan O'Dowd (1959), former general manager of the Colorado Rockies
 David O'Dowd (1942), former chief inspector of constabulary for England and Wales
 Donald O'Dowd (1927), American academic
 Fergus O'Dowd (1948), Irish Fine Gael politician
 James Cornelius O'Dowd (1829–1903), Anglo-Irish barrister and deputy judge advocate general
 James Thomas O'Dowd (1907–1950), a bishop of the Catholic Church in the United States
 John Dowd (born John Leo O'Dowd (1891–1981)), Major League Baseball shortstop
 John O'Dowd (1856–1937), Irish Nationalist Member of Parliament for North Sligo
 John O'Dowd (1967), Irish Sinn Féin politician
 Ken O'Dowd (1950), Australian politician
 Kevin O'Dowd, New Jersey public servant and political figure
 Kris O'Dowd (1988), former American football center
 Max O'Dowd (1994), international cricketer playing for the Netherlands
 Mick O'Dowd, former Gaelic footballer and former senior manager for Meath
 Mike O'Dowd (1895–1957), American middleweight boxer
 Nace O'Dowd (1931–1987), Gaelic footballer who played for the County Sligo team in the 1950s 
 Niall O'Dowd (1953), Irish journalist and author living in the United States
 Patrick O'Dowd (1968), Irish politician and medical practitioner
 Peter O'Dowd (1908–1964), English professional footballer
 Robert Dowd (1936–1996) (aka Robert O'Dowd), American artist
 Seamie O'Dowd, Irish folk musician, Cty Sligo
 Timmy O'Dowd(1963), Irish Gaelic footballer who played for the County Kerry team
Thomas Paul O'Dowd (1886–1930), superintendent, City of San Francisco, California, US 
 Tony O'Dowd (1970), Irish soccer player who played for Leeds Utd and Rep. of Ireland U 21's

References 

 "The Ó Dubhda Family History" By Conor MacHale, Clan O'Dowd Historian, Inniscrone, 1990.
 "The Royal New Zealand Fencibles 1847–1852," , Ruth Alexander, Alan la Roche, Gail Gibson. The New Zealand Fencible Society (Inc), 1997. O'Dowd family papers.

External links 
 O'Dowd family pedigree at Library Ireland
 Genelach hI Dubda
 A website of the O'Dowd, Ó Dubhda etc.. containing information and resource and where the Clan gatherings in Ireland are organised. Previous Clan gatherings documented
 A good genealogy of the O'Dowds
 More details of the O'Dowds and many more Dowd stories
 Book detailing the Great Book of Lecan (with translation) and the history and customs of the Hy Fiachrach
https://odubhdaclan.com/

Anglicised Irish-language surnames
Irish families
Ancient Irish dynasties